Hélder Samir Lopes Semedo Fernandes, known as Samir (born 13 October 1988) is a Cape Verdean football player who plays for Sertanense. He also holds Portuguese citizenship.

Club career
He made his professional debut in the Segunda Liga for Feirense on 23 January 2013 in a game against Leixões.

References

External links
 Soccerway Profile

1988 births
Sportspeople from Praia
Footballers from Santiago, Cape Verde
Living people
Cape Verdean footballers
Odivelas F.C. players
Casa Pia A.C. players
GD Bragança players
C.D. Feirense players
Liga Portugal 2 players
Académico de Viseu F.C. players
Caldas S.C. players
Caudal Deportivo footballers
Cape Verdean expatriate footballers
Expatriate footballers in Spain
Sertanense F.C. players
Association football forwards